Ben Nevis distillery is a whisky distillery in Fort William, Scotland. A coastal distillery in the Western Highlands, the distillery draws its water from the Allt a’Mhuilinn which originates from two pools on Ben Nevis, Coire Leis and Coire na’Ciste. Founded in 1825 as an independent enterprise, it has been owned by Nikka Whisky Distilling of Tokyo, Japan, since 1989.

History
The distillery was founded in 1825 by 'Long John' McDonald, a  descendant of a ruler of the western Scottish kingdom of Argyll (after whom the renowned blended Scotch, Long John, was named). After Long John's death in 1856, ownership was passed down to Donald McDonald, his son.

A second distillery was sited nearby in 1878 and named Nevis Distillery. In a bid to keep up with growing demand, the two distilleries eventually became one in the early twentieth century. In 1955 the distillery was taken over by new proprietors led by Joseph Hobbs. Under Hobbs, the distillery began using continuous distillation, installing a Coffey Still which remained on the site for 26 years and made the distillery one of the first to produce both malt and grain whisky simultaneously. The Japanese company Nikka acquired the distillery in 1989. The heart of the range has been for some time the 10 years old. There have also been a few cask-finishes, limited editions and independent bottlings, notably from Blackadder and Douglas Laing. In 1991, a visitor centre and cafe was opened for the public.

References

 Jackson, Michael, (2004). The Malt Whisky Companion, Penguin Books 2004 
 ScotchWhisky.Net, (2009). Ben Nevis Scotch Whisky Distillery, www.scotchwhisky.net/distilleries/ben_nevis.htm
 Lamond, John, (1995). The Malt Whisky File: A Connoisseur's Guide to Malt Whiskies and Distilleries, Wine Appreciation Guild 1995

External links

The Ben Nevis Distillery on www.visitfortwilliam.co.uk
Whisky Story: Ben Nevis Distillery

Scottish malt whisky
Distilleries in Scotland
Fort William, Highland
1825 establishments in Scotland
Ben Nevis